The Bumpers were a garage rock and beat group from Rome, Italy in the 1960s.  They were one of the three  bands to participate in an Italian liturgical rock mass, called The Mass of the Young in 1966.

In 1966 the Bumpers performed in a rock "beat' mass organized and composed by Marcello Giombini, La Messa Dei Giovani (The Mass of the Young), which premiered in the Borromini Chapel in Rome on April 27, in front of a large public gathering and in the presence of the mass media TV crew of the RAI network.  The event, which also featured two other groups, the Angel Brains and I Barrittas, caused considerable controversy in the Catholic Church, as it was in the process of modernizing its liturgy in the wake of Vatican II.  The Mass was overwhelmingly successful in attracting a young audience, but the response of the Vatican hierarchy was unexpectedly negative and swift.  The band members of the Bumpers and the other groups were excommunicated, though the edict would later be rescinded.   A proposed tour, which included a performance at Albert Hall, was cancelled, when all of the sponsors and venues pulled out simultaneously.   The Ariel company, which had recorded the Mass went bankrupt, and the Bumpers, like the other bands were unable to get gigs even in small Italian towns.  The exhibition was released on the Ariel LP, La Messa Dei Giovani (The Mass of the Young), became a cult favorite over the years, and was recently re-issued on Roman Records.  In 1966, the Bumpers released several singles featuring songs excerpted from the mass, including "I believe (I believe)" b/w "Sanctus (Holy)" and "Marion" backed with the protopunk "Cupidation".

Members
 Giancarlo Martucci : bass and vocals 
 Sandro Gargano : organ and voice 
 Piero Tinacci : lead guitar 
 Amedeo Martucci : drums and vocals 
 Bruno Paoloni : lead guitar

Discography

33 rpm
 1966 : The Mass Youth ( Ariel, lnf 202; with Angel and the Brains and I Barrittas ) - later reprinted by the record company Roman Record Company, RCP 702

45 rpm
 "I believe (I believe)" b/w "Sanctus (Holy)" (Ariel, NF 563, 1966) 
 "Marion" b/w "Cupidation" (Ariel NF 570, 1966)
 Pater Noster by Mass Beat 
 Hallelujah (communion) by Mass Beat 
 Cupidation and Bumper to Bumper soundtrack of the movie "Target for Killing" with Stewart Granger and Curd Jurgens 
 The painting of Picasso of which are authors 
 The dance of the Yo Yo 
 The crocodile, for Pauline Publications

References

Sources cited
 Tiziano Tarli, Beat Italian.  By Hippies in Yellow flag, editions Castelvecchi, Rome 2005  ;  Chapter Masses beat, p. 144  
 Fabio Marchignoli, Pop Italian-inspired Christian publisher La Pieve Poligrafica, 2008;  The rumors Bumpers.  p. 20, and the mass of young people, p 103 
 Alessio Marino, you are blessed!  2, Beat boutique 67, 2008 (photos and information on the beat mass of 1966)
Youth Masses, Black Skin, and Italian Beat Music. I-Italy VIETATA

Musical groups established in 1966
Musical groups from Rome